Jaravi is a city in Puno Province in southeastern Peru. Jaravi is close to Lake Titicaca. Jaravi is at an altitude of 12972 feet. 

Populated places in the Puno Region